"Last Laugh" is an episode from the TV series M*A*S*H. It was the fourth episode of the sixth season, originally airing October 4, 1977 and repeated March 6, 1978, and written by Everett Greenbaum and Jim Fritzell and directed by Don Weis.

Guest cast is James Cromwell as Capt. Leo Bardonaro, Robert Karnes as Major General Frederick Fox, and John Ashton as an MP.

Overview
One of B.J.'s old buddies shows up at the 4077th, and is a bigger practical joker than B.J. or Hawkeye. Unfortunately, his joke backfires and B.J. finds himself charged with a crime, so everybody must now undo the joke so they can exonerate B.J. (and Hawkeye and B.J. can get even).

Detailed story
Colonel Potter receives a telephone call from a colonel at the Provost Marshal's office, informing him that a report has been received that Captain Hunnicutt may have forged his surgeon's credentials. Potter insists that Hunnicutt is a qualified doctor, but the caller persists and informs Potter that he will be coming to the 4077th later that day to make an investigation. Just then Klinger comes in, pretending to be leading a camel. Klinger shows off the "camel", and after a brief show Potter kicks him out of his office. Potter then goes to the mess tent looking for Hunnicutt, and finds Hawkeye and Father Mulcahy sitting down to a meal. He asks his junior officers Hunnicutt's whereabouts, but they do not know. He then explains the situation to them. Just then, B.J. walks in and overhears the conversation. Potter explains to him that he is being investigated, and Hawkeye jokes that B.J. is actually a spy. Potter then mentions the name of the colonel that called. B.J. recognizes the name instantly—his old college roommate Leo Bardonaro. He explains that Bardonaro is a master practical joker, and that he was simply letting B.J. know that he would be stopping by for a visit later that afternoon.

Upon arriving at the camp, Bardonaro is directed to the Swamp. There he is greeted by B.J., who introduces him to Hawkeye. B.J. and Bardonaro reminisce about their old exploits, but soon Bardonaro has to leave, explaining that he has a flight to catch—he's going home! Bardonaro exchanges a cheerful goodbye with the Swampmen, then leaves on his way. Just after he leaves. B.J.'s cigar (which he got from Bardonaro) explodes. (Hawkeye gets "zapped" with a hand held joy-buzzer.)

Later, in Post-Op, B.J. is apprehended by two military policemen. Hawkeye, who is standing nearby, explains that it's just another joke, but the MPs insist on arresting B.J. They walk over to Colonel Potter's office to sort everything out, Hawkeye trying to bribe the MPs along the way. Potter takes a look at the arrest order—it's from Major General Frederick Fox, and it accuses B.J. of "willful misconduct". Potter allows the MPs to take Hunnicutt to Seoul, and an hour later he follows with Hawkeye, evidence in hand.

In his office in Seoul, General Fox accuses Hunnicutt of holding a loud and boisterous party in a hotel room next to one he was occupying with his secretary. He also claims that after the party, Hunnicutt grilled steaks on his hotel room balcony, and the smoke filled General Fox's room. Because of the smoke, Fox and his secretary, both naked, were forced to flee their room, interrupting the General's "official dictation". Potter claims that Hunnicutt was working the night of the alleged incident, and offers the duty logs of that night in support of his claim. Fox claims that the duty logs could have been forged, and presents a copy of the hotel register with what he alleges is Hunnicutt's signature. B.J. argues that the signature is not in his handwriting, and suggests that the register, too, could have been forged. Fox then pulls out a hat, telling B.J. that he must have left it behind in his hurry to leave the hotel. B.J. says the hat is not his and, at General Fox's insistence, puts it on. It is several sizes too large.

Exonerated, B.J. leaves for the 4077th with Potter and Hawkeye. In celebration of their victory "against the brass", all three (including Hawkeye, who is driving) drink wildly and curse Bardonaro. Hawkeye mentions that he'd like to get back at Bardonaro, and B.J. says he'll have a chance soon enough—he had swiped Bardonaro's travel orders just before he left the Swamp. The three return to the camp completely drunk, and they go their separate ways. Colonel Potter finds Klinger and tells him he brought a discharge for the camel, and Hawkeye and B.J. return to the Swamp to find Bardonaro sitting, waiting for them.

Bardonaro begs B.J. for his travel orders, and B.J. finally relents after making Bardonaro promise to stop the childish practical jokes. Bardonaro agrees, and as he heads out the door he remembers that he has no way to get to Kimpo Air Base. B.J. suggests that they use the Jeep he and Hawkeye just returned in, telling him that it's "all gassed up". Bardonaro thanks him and rushes out of the Swamp. Soon after he leaves, Radar comes in with an envelope for B.J. B.J. opens it and finds it's a bill for $580.00 from the hotel in Seoul for damages. He laughs and explains to Hawkeye that Bardonaro will be walking back in half an hour. Hawkeye is confused by this, so B.J. informs him that "the only thing gassed up in that Jeep was us!" A subplot is Margaret Houlihan nearly going crazy about getting in touch with her husband Donald Penobscot.

Trivia
 Major Winchester does not appear in this episode
 Major Houlihan tries to contact her husband at the "2nd Army" in Tokyo. A goof is that the Second United States Army was a World War I and World War II formation-and was not in Korea.
 An anachronism in this episode occurs when General Fox points to the star on his shoulder and asks Hawkeye, "What do these say to you?"  Hawkeye responds by quoting a famous Texaco advertisement rhyme, "Always trust your car to the man who wears a star."  However, Texaco did not introduce this advertisement jingle until 1962, 9 years after the Korean War ended.
 James Cromwell was nearly chosen to play B.J. after the departure of Wayne Rogers' Trapper John, but Mike Farrell ultimately won the role.

External links
 

M*A*S*H (season 6) episodes
1977 American television episodes